Bhanga railway station is a railway station located in Bhanga Upazila, Faridpur District, Dhaka division, Bangladesh.

History

Railway line
Rajbari to Faridpur line was built in 1899. Nine railway stations situated in the railway line were closed on 16 September 1990. The railway line from Pachuria to Faridpur was closed by government on 26 March 1996. But that was not the first time the line was closed. It was stopped before 6 years of the second direction of closure. In 2013, Sheikh Hasina, prime minister of Bangladesh, ordered the reconstruction of the railway line. The Faridpur–Bhanga part of the Pachuria–Bhanga line was completed in 2019.

Station
Bhanga railway station was inaugurated and opened on 24 January 2020 by Md. Nurul Islam Sujon, railway minister of the country.

References

Railway stations in Faridpur District
Railway stations opened in 2020
2020 establishments in Bangladesh